This is a list of the lakes and estuaries of Ukraine with an area over 10 km2. Lakes located on the disputed territory of Crimea are also included.

List

References 

Lakes of Ukraine